Samsung B3210 (also known as Genio QWERTY) is a GSM (2G) phone that was released in October 2009 by Samsung. It has a 2 MP camera and a 2.2-inch TFT screen.  In appearance, its design is like a BlackBerry, but in function it is not a smartphone or a 3G phone.

There is also a touch-screen version of the phone, the Samsung S3650, and the related Samsung B5310 with a larger QWERTY keyboard as a slideout.

Features

 Quad-band GSM/EDGE 
 2.2-inch screen of QVGA resolution 
 40 MB onboard storage, microSD card slot (up to 8 GB) 
 2-megapixel fixed-focus camera with smile detection, QVGA@15fps video recording 
 FM radio with RDS
 Space for a memory card 
 Find Music recognition service
 TouchWiz and Cartoon UI
 Social networking integration with direct file uploads 
 Bluetooth with A2DP, USB v.2.0  
 Smart unlock
 Interchangeable rear covers
 QWERTY keyboard
 3.5mm headphone jack

See also
 GSM
 Mobile phone form factors
 Samsung Telecommunications

References

B3210
Mobile phones introduced in 2009